Newton-on-Rawcliffe is a village and civil parish (as Newton) in the Ryedale district of North Yorkshire, England.

References

External links

Villages in North Yorkshire
Ryedale